Mount Pleasant Armory was a historic National Guard armory located at Mount Pleasant, Westmoreland County, Pennsylvania. It was designed by W.G. Wilkins Co. It was built in 1906, and was a two-story, "T"-shaped brick building executed in the Romanesque style.  It had a flat roof over the administrative section and a gambrel roof over the drill hall.

It was added to the National Register of Historic Places in 1989.  The armory was demolished in 1996.

References

Armories on the National Register of Historic Places in Pennsylvania
Romanesque Revival architecture in Pennsylvania
Infrastructure completed in 1906
Buildings and structures in Westmoreland County, Pennsylvania
National Register of Historic Places in Westmoreland County, Pennsylvania
Buildings and structures demolished in 1996
Demolished buildings and structures in Pennsylvania
1906 establishments in Pennsylvania